Women's 10 km & 12.5 km biathlon events at the 2006 Winter Paralympics were contested at Pragelato on 11 March.

There were 3 events, that for sitting competitors over 10 km and those for visually impaired & standing competitors over 12.5 km. Standings were decided by applying a disability factor to the actual times achieved, and for each missed shot a penalty of one minute was added to the calculated time.

12.5km Visually impaired
The visually impaired event was won by Miyuki Kobayashi, representing .

10km Sitting
The sitting event was won by Olena Iurkovska, representing .

12.5km Standing
The standing event was won by Anne Floriet, representing .

References

W
Biath